The Marmifera, full name , was an Italian industrial railway used for the transport of Carrara marble from the quarries of the municipal territory of Carrara, Tuscany. The route extended from the hillside village of Colonnata to the port of Marina di Carrara.

History 
The railway, projected in 1866, was inaugurated in 1876 and was connected to the pre-existent Avenza-Carrara railway (1866), linking the main station of Carrara Avenza to Carrara San Martino, in city centre. A subsequent expansion to the quarries below the Apuan Alps (Gioia, Ravaccione-Polvaccio and Colonnata) was proposed in 1885. Work began in 1887 and the new branch was inaugurated on 15 May 1890. The line was owned by the FMC (Società Ferrovia Marmifera Privata di Carrara) and 

Even if its bridges were damaged by bombings and sabotages during the Second World War, the line was practically in continuous operation from 1876 to 1964, when it was closed due to competition from road traffic. In 1969 it was closed also the passenger route Avenza-Carrara and the rail tracks dismantled.

Nowadays, apart Avenza FS station, the only area in which the railway is operating is the port of Carrara, connected to the Pisa-La Spezia-Genoa line with a pair of industrial lines. It is part of a route of industrial archaeology and, since 2003 its stations, quarries and bridges over the Vara, have been included in the Archaeological Park of the Apuan Alps.

Route 
The railway line started in the hill village of Colonnata and, following a tortuous path, connects some hill hamlets of Carrara, as Miseglia and Torano, and several quarries, through some branches. Subsequently the railway runs through the city of Carrara and, from San Martino to Avenza station follows a path almost parallel to that of the passenger line. From Avenza FS station to the port, in Marina di Carrara, the line follows a straight parallel to that of the former tramway, with a small branch to the station of Covetta. The only stations passenger service was the one from Avenza to San Martino stations.

See also 

Carrara marble
Avenza-Carrara railway
Lizza di Piastreta

References

External links 

 Marmifera di Carrara website
Hunting for old rail: Ferrovia Marmifera di Carrara

Railway lines in Tuscany
Marble Railway
Rail freight transport in Italy
Railway lines opened in 1876
Railway lines closed in 1964
Industrial archaeological sites
Industrial railways
Mining in Italy
Marble